The Minister of State at the Department of Education is a junior ministerial post in the Department of Education of the Government of Ireland who performs duties and functions delegated by the Minister for Education. A Minister of State does not hold cabinet rank.

The current Minister of State is Josepha Madigan, TD, who was appointed in July 2020.

List of Parliamentary Secretaries

List of Ministers of State

References

Education
Department of Education (Ireland)